Jeff Barker (born 1954) is an American playwright, director, professor, and actor. He has written plays such as Kin, Unspoken for Time, and September Bears. He is an advocate for the restoration of the ancient plays of Israel, co-creating Terror Texts (with composers Joseph Barker and Heather Josslyn-Cranson) and And God Said (with composer Ron Melrose). He also acted in the film "The Prairie Pirates" directed by Jamey Durham.

Biography
Barker grew up in Mendota, Illinois. His first play was written and produced during his time in undergraduate school at Greenville College and continued on to earn an M.A. at Northern Illinois University as well as an M.F.A. at University of South Dakota.  Since 1988, he and his wife Karen have held professorships in acting and directing at Northwestern College and they both retired in 2020. He has over thirty produced scripts to his credit. September Bears, his 9/11-based play, appeared off-Broadway in 2003.  Barker and his wife have three children (Joseph, Hannah, and Daniel) and make their home in Orange City, Iowa. Barker is an elder in the Reformed Church in America and also serves on the faculty of the Institute for Worship Studies in Orange Park, FL.

Selection of plays and musicals
Sioux Center Sudan
Albie’s Honor (commissioned by Saltworks Theatre Company)
September Bears
Kin: The Trial of Carrie Buck
Unspoken for Time (Dramatic Publishing Company, Inc.)
Cross Purposes
The Final Approach of Flight 232 (adaptation)
When Scott Comes Home
Super Bowl/Dionysus
The White Leopard (written with Karen Bohm Barker)
Joseph and His Brothers

Non-dramatic publications
"The Power of Telling a Story" (chapter in Church of All Ages, 2008)
"The Other Driver" (essay in Perspectives, October, 2004)
"Ancient Israelite Dramas" (essay in Christianity and Theatre, Spring, 2004)
"Danyale’s Wedding" (essay in Christianity and Theatre, Spring, 2000)
"One Lonely Saturday" (story in Church Herald, January, 1994)
"Starting a Drama Ministry" (co-authored with Karen Bohm Barker, Church Herald, October, 1992)

Awards
Iowa Professor of the Year, 2006
The Endowed Professor of Northwestern College, 2006–2011
Finalist for the Arlin G. Meyer Prize, 2005 (for Kin)
Council for Christian Colleges & Universities alumni award winner, 2004
Gold Medallion, the Kennedy Center American College Theatre Festival, 2003, Region V
Grand Prize winner of the 2002 Iowa Playwrights Competition (for Kin)
Medallion Award, Seattle Pacific University, 1997
Meritorious Achievement Award, the Kennedy Center's American College Theatre Festival, for the script of Unspoken For Time, 1995
Kennedy Center American College Theatre Festival's Michael Kanin Playwriting Competition, Second Place nationally, Short Play category, 1993 (for The Final Approach of Flight 232)
Teacher of the Year (shared with Karen Bohm Barker), Northwestern College, 1991

References

External links
http://www.nwciowa.edu//barkerplays
http://storyandworship.wordpress.com/
http://www.myspace.com/terrortextsthemusical
https://www.youtube.com/AncientPlays
https://www.youtube.com/TerrorTexts

1954 births
Northern Illinois University alumni
University of South Dakota alumni
20th-century American dramatists and playwrights
Living people